Notre Dame High School is a coeducational, Roman Catholic, college preparatory school in the Lawrenceville section of Lawrence Township, in Mercer County, New Jersey, United States. The school operates under the supervision of the Roman Catholic Diocese of Trenton. The school is accredited by AdvancED.

As of the 2019–20 school year, the school had an enrollment of 924 students and 68.3 classroom teachers (on an FTE basis), for a student–teacher ratio of 13.5:1. The school's student body was 76.4% (706) White, 7.4% (68) Black, 5.7% (53) two or more races, 5.1% (47) Hispanic, 5.0% (46) Asian, 0.2% (2) American Indian / Alaska Native and 0.2% (2) Native Hawaiian / Pacific Islander.

History
Built in 1957, Notre Dame High School is located in Lawrenceville, near Princeton University, Rider University, The College of New Jersey, The Lawrenceville School, and Hun School of Princeton. The Catholic Diocese of Trenton also neighbors the school. The main building itself is square in shape, housing classrooms on two floors. Its mascot is the "Irish," usually displayed on athletic wear as a shamrock affixed to "ND." The current president is Ken Jennings, accompanied by principal Joanna Barlow.

The school uses a form of block scheduling for its students. In a typical semester, a student has three 80-minute block classes and two 40-minute blocks. One of the 40-minute periods is usually reserved for a lunch period, while the other is reserved for physical education or an additional 40-minute class. There is an "activity period" between the four 80-minute blocks during the day in which students can study, take an additional lunch period, or participate in various school activities (groups, clubs, community service).

The school features a newly renovated theatre, gymnasium, student center (cafeteria), several standard classrooms, offices, computer and science labs, school store (The Leprechaun Shop), a renovated track, wrestling room, cross country path, weight-room, turf field with stands, tennis courts, various outdoor playing fields, media center–library, chapel, campus ministry, broadcasting studio, College & School Counseling office, and courtyard.

Parallel to the school's student parking lot flows Shabakunk Creek, which was the location of a Revolutionary War skirmish between American rebels led by Colonel Edward Hand and the British military, delaying the British before the Second Battle of Trenton. A small commemorative sign marks the spot where the battle occurred.

Class of 2019 student data
The 2019 averages of the school's SAT scores were 536 Critical Reading, 536 Writing and 544 Math. Fourteen Advanced Placement Program courses were tested. Of 519 AP exams taken, 108 students had a score of 5; 151 had a score of 4; and 156 had a score of 3. The class had one student who was recognized as a semi-finalist and 11 students who were recognized as Commended Scholars by the National Merit Scholarship Program. 99% of students went on to college, with 87% going on to a four-year college, 12% to a two-year college, and 1% to employment or the military.

Performing arts
Notre Dame High School has an active performing arts department which presents three productions annually: a fall drama or comedy, a late-winter musical, and a late-spring comedy, drama, or musical.  Past performances have included The Little Mermaid, Show Boat, Kiss Me, Kate, Godspell, Man of La Mancha, Inherit the Wind, Grease, West Side Story, The Crucible, Beauty and the Beast, You Can't Take It with You, Scapino!, Les Misérables, The Pajama Game, Peter Pan, Footloose, Seussical, Hairspray and Anything Goes. The musicals annually perform for audiences from 3,500 to 5,000.

Along with theatrical productions, a dance program entitled Fusion, based on contemporary dance styles, is rehearsed during the fall and performs later in the winter. The dance program, which is headed by Debby Rittler Gibilisco, has three separate levels. The Performing Arts Department, led by Lou Gibilisco, offers classes such as Digital Recording, Piano Technique, and Musical Theory, along with overseeing the various musical groups in the school: Concert Choir, String Ensemble, Concert Band, Jazz Band, and Madrigal Choir (the latter two requiring auditions). The Concert Band, Fusion dance, and Madrigal all travel to Disney World (alternating every year between the Concert Band and the Madrigal/Fusion) to participate in workshops, master classes, and performances.

Athletics
The Notre Dame High School Irish participate in the Colonial Valley Conference, which is comprised of high schools from Mercer, Middlesex and Monmouth counties, and operates under the supervision of the New Jersey State Interscholastic Athletic Association. With 865 students in grades 10-12, the school was classified by the NJSIAA for the 2019–20 school year as Non-Public A for most athletic competition purposes, which included schools with an enrollment of 381 to 1,454 students in that grade range (equivalent to Group III for public schools). The football team competes in the Capitol Division of the 95-team West Jersey Football League superconference and was classified by the NJSIAA as Non-Public Group IV  for football for 2018–2020. In the 2018 season, the football team won the Capitol Division. The school is historically known for its football team and track program, which have both earned numerous awards and acknowledgments.

In the 2012–13 season, Notre Dame won seven Colonial Valley Conference Championships (in girls' soccer, boys' basketball, girls' basketball, boys' swimming, ice hockey, baseball, and girls' lacrosse) and three Mercer County Titles (in boys' basketball, ice hockey and baseball).  The boys' basketball and girls' lacrosse teams had their best seasons in school history. The boys' basketball team finished with a record of 25-4 while the girls' lacrosse team went 17–4, losing in the Group III South state final to national power Moorestown High School. The ice hockey team had a six-year, 81-game winning streak in Colonial Valley Conference play, spanning from 2011 until a close loss to rival Princeton High School 4–3 on January 6, 2017.

The boys soccer team won the Non-Public Group A state championship in 1961 (defeating runner-up St. Cecilia High School in the final of the tournament), 1966 (vs. St. Aloysius High School), 1967 (vs. Trenton Cathedral High School), 1970 (vs. St. Joseph High School), 1974 (vs. Christian Brothers Academy), 1975 (vs. Seton Hall Preparatory School), 1977 (vs. Seton Hall Prep), 1982 (vs. Don Bosco Preparatory High School), 1983 (vs. Hudson Catholic Regional High School), 1984 (vs. Don Bosco) and 1991 (as co-champion with Don Bosco). The program's 10 state titles are tied for fifth in the state.

The girls' outdoor track and field team won the Non-Public A state championship in 1982-1985 and 1993–2000. The 12 state championships won by the girls' squad is tied for the most by any school and the eight consecutive titles won from 1993 to 2000 marks the longest streak of any school in the state. Notre Dame's Sabrina Alexander won the Non-Public A state championship in the 100m hurdles in 2013. Vanessa Romulus won the Non-Public A state championship in the high jump in 2012 and 2013. Nicole Kurtain won the Non-Public A individual cross country championship in 2001.

The football team won the Non-Public Group A South state sectional championship in 1983 and 1989. The 1983 team won the Non-Public A South sectional title after defeating Holy Spirit High School by a score of 10-6 in the championship game.

The baseball team won the Non-Public Group A state championship in 1983 (defeating Essex Catholic High School in the tournament final), 1985 (vs. Bergen Catholic High School), 1987 (vs. Bergen Catholic), 1990 (vs. Saint Joseph Regional High School), 1991 (vs. Seton Hall Preparatory School). The program's five state titles are tied for eighth in the state. The 1983 team had a season record of 23-6 after winning the Parochial A title by defeating Essex Catholic by a score of 5-4 in the championship game.

The girls track team won the Non-Public indoor relay state championship in 1984, won the Group III title in 1996, the group II title in 1997, and the Group I title in 2020 (as co-champion); the four state titles won by the girls program is tied for tenth in the state. The boys team won the Group III title in 2007.

The girls soccer team won the Group IV title in 1985 (defeating Morris Knolls High School in the tournament final) and the Group III state championship in 1994 (as co-champion with West Morris Central High School). The team won the Non-Public A South title in 2015 over Holy Cross Academy on penalty kicks, with the score tied at 2-2 after two overtimes.

The field hockey team won the Central Jersey Group IV state sectional championship in 1985 and 1987, and won the title in Central Jersey Group III in 1994.

The boys track team won the Non-Public Group A spring track state championship in 1992, 1996, 1997 and 2005.

The Notre Dame girls' basketball team won the Non-Public A state championships in 1995 (against runner-up Immaculate Heart Academy in the finals) and in 1996 (vs. Paramus Catholic High School). In 2014, the girls' basketball team won the Mercer County Tournament championship for the eighth time, defeating Hopewell Valley Central High School by a score of 49–35 in the tournament final.

The girls track team won the indoor track Group III state championship in 1996 and won in Group II in 1997. The boys team won the Group II title in 1997 and the Group III title in 1998.

The softball team won the Non-Public A state championship in 2006 and 2007, defeating Mount Saint Dominic Academy in the tournament final both years. The team won the 2007 South A state sectional championship with a 2–1 win over Red Bank Catholic High School in the tournament final. The team then won the Non-Public Group A state championship with a 1–0 win over Mount Saint Dominic Academy to finish the season with a record of 26-4. NJ.com / The Star-Ledger ranked Notre Dame as their number-one softball team in the state in 2007.

The tennis team won the 1999 South A state sectional championship with a 4–1 win over Monsignor Donovan High School in the tournament final at Veterans Park.

The Notre Dame golf team won their first Mercer County Golf Championship in 2009, ending a 23-year drought with a total team score of 314, six shots better than the closest team.

The boys' swim team capped their 2009–10 season undefeated and went on to win the Mercer County Tournament for the third straight year.

In the 2014–15 season, the athletic programs won three state regional championships.

In 2018, wrestler Joe Schneider broke the all-time win record at the school.

In 2019, Angelina Romero became the first wrestler in the school's history to place at states, coming in second in the 118-lb. girl's category during the New Jersey State tournament in Atlantic City.

Notable alumni 

 David Bird (1959–2014), financial journalist who covered energy markets at The Wall Street Journal
 Edward Bloor (born 1950, class of 1968), author of Tangerine and London Calling.
 Melisa Can (born 1984 as Michelle Marie Campbell), professional basketball player at the power forward position who plays for Adana ASKİ.
 Martin Connor (born 1945), member of the New York Senate from 1978 to 2008.
 Tom Guiry (born 1981), actor who played a lead role in The Sandlot
 Rich Gunnell (born 1987), former wide receiver and current coach for Boston College Eagles football
 Skip Harlicka (born 1946), former NBA basketball player for the Atlanta Hawks.
 Scott Horta (born 1988), capped member of the Puerto Rico national football team
 Guy Hutchinson (born 1974), author, broadcaster, theme park historian and comedian
 Star Jones (born 1962), television personality
 Dick LaRossa (born 1946), politician and former television presenter who served two terms in the New Jersey Senate, where he represented the 15th Legislative District.
 Ed Moran (born 1981), professional track and road runner in distances from the 5000 meter to the marathon
 E. J. Nemeth (born 1983), retired arena football quarterback
 Jake Nerwinski (born 1994, class of 2013), Major League Soccer player for the Vancouver Whitecaps.
 Bob Picozzi (born 1951, class of 1968), television and radio announcer for ESPN and Fox Sports.
 Chris Prynoski (born 1971), animator.
 Duane Robinson (born 1968, class of 1986), retired professional soccer forward who played in the American Professional Soccer League and the United States Interregional Soccer League.
 Richard Schmierer (born 1950, class of 1968), State Department Foreign Service Officer who served as United States Ambassador to Oman.
 Brian Siemann (born 1989), member of the 2012 United States Paralympic Team who won gold medals in the 100m and 200m.
 Bob Terlecki (born 1945), MLB pitcher who played for the Philadelphia Phillies in 1972.
 Tiquan Underwood (born 1987), wide receiver for the Carolina Panthers.
 Anthony Verrelli (born 1964), union leader and politician who represents the 15th Legislative District in the New Jersey General Assembly.

References

External links
 Official Notre Dame website
 Data for Notre Dame High School, National Center for Education Statistics

1957 establishments in New Jersey
Educational institutions established in 1957
Lawrence Township, Mercer County, New Jersey
Middle States Commission on Secondary Schools
Roman Catholic Diocese of Trenton
Catholic secondary schools in New Jersey
Private high schools in Mercer County, New Jersey